The ARIA Urban Chart is a chart that ranks the best-performing Urban tracks singles of Australia. It is published by Australian Recording Industry Association (ARIA), an organisation who collect music data for the weekly ARIA Charts. To be eligible to appear on the chart, the recording must be a single, and be "predominantly of a Urban nature".

Chart history

Number-one artists

See also

2003 in music
List of number-one singles of 2003 (Australia)

References

Australia Urban
Urban 2003
Number-one Urban singles